The SIIMA Award for Best Film – Telugu is presented by Vibri media group as part of its annual South Indian International Movie Awards for Telugu films. The award was first given in 2012 for films released in 2011.

Winners

Nominations 
2011: Dookudu – Ram Achanta, Gopichand Achanta, Anil Sunkara / 14 Reels Entertainment
Sri Rama Rajyam – Sri Sai Baba Movies / Yalamanchali Sai Babu
Mr. Perfect – Dil Raju / Sri Venkateswara Creations
100% Love – Geetha Arts / Bunny Vasu
Ala Modalaindi – K. L. Damodar Prasad / Sri Ranjith Movies
2012: Eega – Korrapati Ranganatha Sai / Vaaraahi Chalana Chitram
Gabbar Singh – Bandla Ganesh / Parameswara Art Productions
Ishq – N. Sudheer Reddy, Vikram Gowd
Julai –  S. Radha Krishna, D.V.V. Danayya / Haarika & Hasinee Creations
Poola Rangadu  – R. R. Venkat, Atchi Reddy / R. R. Movie Makers
2013: Attarintiki Daredi – B. V. S. N. Prasad / Reliance Entertainment & Sri Venkateswara Cine Chitra
Gunde Jaari Gallanthayyinde – Nikitha Reddy / Sresht Movies
Seethamma Vakitlo Sirimalle Chettu – Dil Raju /Sri Venkateswara Creations
Mirchi – V. Vamsi Krishna Reddy Pramod Uppalapati / UV Creations 
Prema Katha Chitram –   Maruthi & Sudharshan Reddy / Maruthi Media House Productions
2014: Manam – Annapurna Studios / Nagarjuna
Legend – Ram Achanta, Gopichand Achanta, Anil Sunkara /14 Reels Entertainment
Govindudu Andarivadele – Bandla Ganesh / Parameswara Art Productions
Chandamama Kathalu – Chanakya Booneti
Race Gurram –  Nallamalapu Srinivas / Sri Lakshmi Narasimha Productions 
2015: Baahubali: The Beginning – Shobu Yarlagadda & Prasad Devineni / Arka Media Works 
Bhale Bhale Magadivoy – Bunny Vassu / UV Creations
Kanche – Y. Rajeev Reddy & J. Sai Babu / First Frame Entertainments
Srimanthudu – Mythri Movie Makers
Rudramadevi – Gunasekhar / Gunaa Team Works
2016: Pelli Choopulu – BigBen Cinemas & Dharmapath Creations
A Aa – S. Radha Krishna / Haarika & Hasinee Creations
Janatha Garage – Mythri Movie Makers
Kshanam – Prasad V. Potluri / PVP Cinema
Sarrainodu – Allu Aravind / Geetha Arts
2017: Baahubali 2: The Conclusion – Shobu Yarlagadda & Prasad Devineni / Arka Media Works 
Fidaa – Dil Raju / Sri Venkateswara Creations
Gautamiputra Satakarni – Y. Rajeev Reddy / First Frame Entertainments
Ghazi – Prasad V. Potluri / PVP Cinema & K. Anvesh Reddy/Matinee Entertainment
Sathamanam Bhavati –Dil Raju / Sri Venkateswara Creations
2018: Mahanati – Swapna Dutt & Priyanka Dutt / Vyjayanthi Movies
Aravinda Sametha Veera Raghava – S. Radha Krishna / Haarika & Hasinee Creations
Bharat Ane Nenu – D. V. V. Danayya / DVV Entertainments
Geetha Govindam – Bunny Vasu / GA2 Pictures
Rangasthalam – Mythri Movie Makers
2019: Jersey – Sithara Entertainments
Maharshi – Sri Venkateswara Creations
Majili – Shine Screens
Sye Raa Narasimha Reddy – Konidela Production Company
F2: Fun and Frustration – Sri Venkateswara Creations
 2020: Ala Vaikunthapurramuloo – Geetha Arts / Haarika & Hassine Creations
 Sarileru Neekevvaru – Sri Venkateswara Creations / G. Mahesh Babu Entertainment / AK Entertainments
 Bheeshma – Sithara Entertainments
 Solo Brathuke So Better – Sri Venkateswara Cine Chitra
 Uma Maheswara Ugra Roopasya – Arka Media Works, Mahayana Motion Pictures
 2021: Pushpa: The Rise – Mythri Movie Makers / Muttamsetty Media
 Akhanda – Dwaraka Creations
 Love Story – Amigos Creations, Sree Venkateswara Cinemas
 Jathi Ratnalu – Swapna Cinema
 Uppena – Mythri Movie Makers, Sukumar Writings

See also 

 Tollywood
 South Indian International Movie Awards
 1st South Indian International Movie Awards
 2nd South Indian International Movie Awards
 3rd South Indian International Movie Awards
 4th South Indian International Movie Awards
 5th South Indian International Movie Awards
 6th South Indian International Movie Awards
 7th South Indian International Movie Awards
 8th South Indian International Movie Awards

References 

South Indian International Movie Awards
Telugu cinema
Awards for best film